Ramayah Ramachandran (born 10 September 1970) is a former professional tennis player from Malaysia.

Biography
Born in Negeri Sembilan, Ramachandran is one of seven siblings and started playing tennis at the age of nine. He learned his tennis at the National Tennis Centre in Kuala Lumpur.

During the 1990s he was a regular fixture in the Malaysia Davis Cup team, appearing in a total of 21 ties.

Ramachandran was granted a wildcard into two ATP Tour singles main draws in 1993, both for tournaments hosted in Kuala Lumpur.

He was a singles bronze medalist at the 1993 Southeast Asian Games and was a member of the bronze medal winning Malaysian team at the 1994 Asian Games.

References

External links
 
 
 

1970 births
Living people
Malaysian male tennis players
People from Negeri Sembilan
Southeast Asian Games bronze medalists for Malaysia
Southeast Asian Games medalists in tennis
Tennis players at the 1994 Asian Games
Medalists at the 1994 Asian Games
Asian Games bronze medalists for Malaysia
Asian Games medalists in tennis
Competitors at the 1993 Southeast Asian Games
20th-century Malaysian people